Nobis Hotel Stockholm is an upscale hotel in central Stockholm, Sweden. Located on Norrmalmstorg, the hotel has 201 rooms."A Stay At A Truly 'Captivating' Hotel" – HuffPost, 31 August, 2012 Its atrium is one of its notable features.

Stockholm syndrome
It was in Kreditbanken, which formerly occupied the ground floor of the building in which the hotel is now located, where the term "Stockholm syndrome" was coined in 1973. Four hostages were taken during a bank robbery. The hostages defended their captors after being released and would not agree to testify in court against them. It was noted that in this case, however, the police were perceived to have acted with little care for the hostages' safety, providing an alternative reason for their unwillingness to testify. Stockholm syndrome is paradoxical because the sympathetic sentiments that captives feel towards their captors are the opposite of the fear and disdain which an onlooker might feel towards the captors.

Gallery

References

External links
 
Nobis Hotel – Design Hotels

Hotels in Stockholm
Hotels established in 2010
19th-century establishments in Sweden